Mariam Garikhuli, official name Mariam Lukas Tatishvili-Ratiani, (20 March 1883–9 February 1960) was a Georgian writer and actress. As an author, under the pseudonym Garikhuli (meaning "ostracized" or "outcast"), she contributed to magazines and newspapers, publishing her first short story "ცხოვრების მსხვერპლი" (Victim of Life) in 1905. Assisted by Lado Meskhishvili, she adapted works by Ilia Chavchavadze and Akaki Tsereteli for the theatre. In addition to contributing to various children's publications, she is remembered for her novel ანარეკლი (Reflection) written in the 1930s. As an actress, she performed at theatres in Kutaisi (1902–1904), Gori (1920–1926) and at the Tbilisi Film Studio (1927–1941).

References 

1883 births
1960 deaths
Women short story writers
People from Kutaisi
Novelists from Georgia (country)
20th-century women writers from Georgia (country)
20th-century actresses from Georgia (country)
Women novelists
Film actresses from Georgia (country)
Stage actresses from Georgia (country)